SMS  was the second of two s of the Imperial German Navy, launched in 1911 and named after the German Franco-Prussian War veteran General August Karl von Goeben.

Several months after her commissioning in 1912, with the light cruiser , formed the German Mediterranean Division and patrolled there during the Balkan Wars. After the outbreak of World War I on 28 July 1914,  and  bombarded French positions in North Africa and then evaded British naval forces in the Mediterranean and reached Constantinople. By bombarding Russian facilities in the Black Sea, she brought Turkey into World War I on the German side. The ship operated primarily against Russian forces in the Black Sea during the war, including several inconclusive engagements with Russian battleships. She made a sortie into the Aegean in January 1918 that resulted in the Battle of Imbros, where  sank a pair of British monitors but was herself badly damaged by mines.

In 1936 she was officially renamed TCG  ("Ship of the Turkish Republic "); she carried the remains of Mustafa Kemal Atatürk from Istanbul to İzmit in 1938.  remained the flagship of the Turkish Navy until she was decommissioned in 1950. She was scrapped in 1973, after the West German government declined an invitation to buy her back from Turkey. She was the last surviving ship built by the Imperial German Navy, and the longest-serving dreadnought-type ship in any navy.

Design 

Her crew consisted on 43 officers and 1,010 enlisted men.

The ship was armed with a main battery of ten  SK L/50 guns mounted in five twin-gun turrets; of these, one was placed forward, two were en echelon amidships, and the other two were in a superfiring pair aft. Her secondary armament consisted of twelve  SK L/45 guns placed in individual casemates in the central portion of the ship. For defense against torpedo boats, she carried twelve  SK L/45 guns, also in individual mounts in the bow, the stern, and around the forward conning tower. She was also equipped with four  submerged torpedo tubes, one in the bow, one in the stern, and one on each broadside.

The ship's armor consisted of Krupp cemented steel. The main battery gun turrets had  faces, and they sat atop barbettes that were equally thick.

Service history 

The Imperial Navy ordered , the third German battlecruiser, on 8 April 1909 under the provisional name "H" from the Blohm & Voss shipyard in Hamburg, under construction number 201. Her keel was laid on 19 August; the hull was completed and the ship was launched on 28 March 1911. Fitting-out work followed, and she was commissioned into the German Navy on 2 July 1912.

When the First Balkan War broke out in October 1912, the German General Staff determined that a naval Mediterranean Division was needed to project German power in the Mediterranean, and thus dispatched  and the light cruiser  to Constantinople. The two ships left Kiel on 4 November and arrived on 15 November 1912. Beginning in April 1913,  visited many Mediterranean ports including Venice, Pola, and Naples, before sailing into Albanian waters. Following this trip,  returned to Pola and remained there from 21 August to 16 October for maintenance.

On 29 June 1913, the Second Balkan War broke out and the Mediterranean Division was retained in the area. On 23 October 1913,  (Rear Admiral) Wilhelm Souchon assumed command of the squadron.  and  continued their activities in the Mediterranean, and visited some 80 ports before the outbreak of World War I. The navy made plans to replace  with her sister , but the assassination of Archduke Franz Ferdinand of Austria in Sarajevo, Bosnia, on 28 June 1914 and the subsequent rise in tensions between the Great Powers made this impossible. After the assassination, Souchon assessed that war was imminent between the Central Powers and the Triple Entente, and ordered his ships to make for Pola for repairs. Engineers came from Germany to work on the ship.  had 4,460 boiler tubes replaced, among other repairs. Upon completion, the ships departed for Messina.

World War I

Kaiser Wilhelm II had ordered that in the event of war,  and  should either conduct raids in the western Mediterranean to prevent the return of French troops from North Africa to Europe, or break out into the Atlantic and attempt to return to German waters, on the squadron commander's discretion.  On 3 August 1914, the two ships were en route to Algeria when Souchon received word of the declaration of war against France.  bombarded Philippeville, French Algeria, for about 10 minutes early on 3 August while  shelled nearby Bône, in accordance with the Kaiser's order. Tirpitz and Admiral Hugo von Pohl then transmitted secret orders to Souchon instructing him to sail to Constantinople, in direct contravention of the Kaiser's instructions and without his knowledge.

Since  could not reach Constantinople without coaling, Souchon headed for Messina. Refueling in Messina was complicated by the declaration of Italian neutrality on 2 August. Under international law, combatant ships were permitted only 24 hours in a neutral port. Despite the additional time, s fuel stocks were not sufficient to permit the voyage to Constantinople, so Souchon arranged to rendezvous with another collier in the Aegean Sea. The French fleet remained in the western Mediterranean, since the French naval commander in the Mediterranean, Admiral Lapeyrère, was convinced the Germans would either attempt to escape to the Atlantic or join the Austrians in Pola.

Souchon's two ships departed Messina early on 6 August through the southern entrance to the strait and headed for the eastern Mediterranean. The two British battlecruisers were 100 miles away, while a third, was coaling in Bizerta, Tunisia. The Germans headed initially towards the Adriatic in a feint; the move misled Troubridge, who sailed to intercept them in the mouth of the Adriatic. After realizing his mistake, Troubridge reversed course and ordered the light cruiser  and two destroyers to launch a torpedo attack on the Germans. s lookouts spotted the ships, and in the darkness, she and  evaded their pursuers undetected. Troubridge broke off the chase early on 7 August, convinced that any attack by his four older armored cruisers against —armed with her larger 28 cm guns—would be suicidal. Souchon's journey to Constantinople was now clear.

 refilled her coal bunkers off the island of Donoussa near Naxos. During the afternoon of 10 August, the two ships entered the Dardanelles. They were met by an Ottoman picket boat, which guided them through to the Sea of Marmara. To circumvent neutrality requirements, the Ottoman government proposed that the ships be transferred to its ownership "by means of a fictitious sale." Before the Germans could approve this, the Ottomans announced on 11 August that they had purchased the ships for 80 million Marks. In a formal ceremony the two ships were commissioned in the Ottoman Navy on 16 August.

Black Sea operations

1914 

On 29 October  bombarded Sevastopol in her first operation against Imperial Russia, though the Ottoman Empire was not yet at war with the Entente; Souchon conducted the operation to force Turkey into the war on the side of Germany. A  shell struck the ship in the after funnel, but it failed to detonate and did negligible damage. Two other hits inflicted minor damage. The ship and her escorts passed through an inactive Russian minefield during the bombardment. As she returned to Turkish waters,  came across the Russian minelayer  which scuttled herself with 700 mines on board. During the engagement the escorting Russian destroyer  was damaged by two of s secondary battery  shells. In response to the bombardment, Russia declared war on 1 November, thus forcing the Ottomans into the wider world war. France and Great Britain bombarded the Turkish fortresses guarding the Dardanelles on 3 November and formally declared war two days later.

Despite the noon hour the conditions were foggy and none of the capital ships were spotted initially. The Black Sea Fleet had experimented with concentrating fire from several ships under the control of one "master" ship before the war, and  held her fire until , the master ship, could see . She scored a hit with her first salvo as a 12-inch shell partially penetrated the armor casemate protecting one of s  secondary guns. It detonated some of the ready-use ammunition, starting a fire that filled the casemate and killed the entire gun crew. A total of thirteen men were killed and three were wounded.

 returned fire and hit  in the middle funnel; the shell detonated after it passed through the funnel and destroyed the antennae for the fire-control radio, so that  could not correct s inaccurate range data. The other Russian ships either used s incorrect data or never saw  and failed to register any hits.  hit  four more times, although one shell failed to detonate, before Souchon decided to break contact after 14 minutes of combat. The four hits out of nineteen  shells fired killed 34 men and wounded 24.

The following month, on 5–6 December,  and  provided protection for troop transports, and on 10 December,  bombarded Batum. On 23 December,  and the protected cruiser  escorted three transports to Trebizond. While returning from another transport escort operation on 26 December,  struck a mine that exploded beneath the conning tower, on the starboard side, about one nautical mile outside the Bosphorus. The explosion tore a  hole in the ship's hull, but the torpedo bulkhead held. Two minutes later,  struck a second mine on the port side, just forward of the main battery wing barbette; this tore open a  hole. The bulkhead bowed in  but retained watertight protection of the ship's interior. However, some 600 tons of water flooded the ship. There was no dock in the Ottoman Empire large enough to service , so temporary repairs were effected inside steel cofferdams, which were pumped out to create a dry work area around the damaged hull. The holes were patched with concrete, which held for several years before more permanent work was necessary.

1915 
As they sailed west after a course correction,  struck a mine and sank, so this attack had to be aborted. After  and  appeared off Sevastopol and sank two cargo steamers, the Russian fleet chased them all day, and detached several destroyers after dusk to attempt a torpedo attack. Only one destroyer, was able to close the distance and launch an attack, which missed.  and  returned to the Bosphorus unharmed.

On 25 April, the same day the Allies landed at Gallipoli, Russian naval forces arrived off the Bosphorus and bombarded the forts guarding the strait. Two days later  headed south to the Dardanelles to bombard Allied troops at Gallipoli, accompanied by the pre-dreadnought battleship . They were spotted at dawn from a kite balloon as they were getting into position. When the first  round from the dreadnought  landed close by,  moved out of firing position, close to the cliffs, where Queen Elizabeth could not engage her. On 30 April  tried again, but was spotted from the pre-dreadnought  which had moved into the Dardanelles to bombard the Turkish headquarters at Çanakkale. The British ship only managed to fire five rounds before  moved out of her line of sight.

On 1 May,  sailed to the Bay of Beikos in the Bosphorus after the Russian fleet bombarded the fortifications at the mouth of the Bosphorus. Around 7 May,  sortied from the Bosphorus in search of Russian ships as far as Sevastopol, but found none. Running short on main gun ammunition, she did not bombard Sevastopol. Within the first ten minutes she had been hit twice, although she was not seriously damaged. Admiral Souchon disengaged and headed for the Bosphorus, pursued by Russian light forces. Later that month two of the ship's 15 cm guns were taken ashore for use there, and the four 8.8 cm guns in the aft superstructure were removed at the same time. Four 8.8 cm anti-aircraft were installed on the aft superstructure by the end of 1915.

During transit, the convoy was attacked by the Russian submarine , which sank one of the colliers. The following day,  and another submarine tried to attack  as well, though they were unable to reach a firing position.

On 21 September,  was again sent out of the Bosphorus to drive off three Russian destroyers which had been attacking Turkish coal ships. Escort missions continued until 14 November, when the submarine  nearly hit  with two torpedoes just outside the Bosphorus. Admiral Souchon decided the risk to the battlecruiser was too great, and suspended the convoy system. In its stead, only those ships fast enough to make the journey from Zonguldak to Constantinople in a single night were permitted; outside the Bosphorus they would be met by torpedo boats to defend them against the lurking submarines.

1916–1917 

Admiral Souchon sent Yavuz to Zonguldak on 8 January to protect an approaching empty collier from Russian destroyers in the area, but the Russians sank the transport ship before Yavuz arrived. On the return trip to the Bosphorus, Yavuz encountered Imperatritsa Ekaterina. The two ships engaged in a brief artillery duel, beginning at a range of 18,500 meters. Yavuz turned to the southwest, and in the first four minutes of the engagement, fired five salvos from her main guns. Neither ship scored any hits, though shell splinters from near misses struck Yavuz. This was the only battle between dreadnoughts on the Black Sea to ever occur. Though nominally much faster than Imperatritsa Ekaterina, the Turkish battlecruiser's bottom was badly fouled and her propeller shafts were in poor condition. This made it difficult for Yavuz to escape from the powerful Russian battleship, which was reported to have reached .

Russian forces were making significant gains into Ottoman territory during the Caucasus Campaign. In an attempt to prevent further advances by the Russian army, Yavuz rushed 429 officers and men, a mountain artillery battery, machine gun and aviation units, 1,000 rifles, and 300 cases of munitions to Trebizond on 4 February. On 4 March, the Russian navy landed a detachment of some 2,100 men, along with mountain guns and horses, on either side of the port of Atina. The Turks were caught by surprise and forced to evacuate. Another landing took place at Kavata Bay, some 5 miles east of Trebizond, in June. In late June, the Turks counterattacked and penetrated around 20 miles into the Russian lines. Yavuz and Midilli conducted a series of coastal operations to support the Turkish attacks. On 4 July, Yavuz shelled the port of Tuapse, where she sank a steamer and a motor schooner. The Turkish ships sailed northward to circle back behind the Russians before the two Russian dreadnoughts left Sevastopol to try to attack them. They then returned to the Bosphorus, where Yavuz was docked for repairs to her propeller shafts until September.

The coal shortage continued to worsen until Admiral Souchon was forced to suspend operations by Yavuz and Midilli through 1917. It missed but instead sank the destroyer , the largest ship sunk by air during the First World War. After an armistice between Russia and the Ottoman Empire was signed in December 1917 following the Bolshevik revolution, formalized in the Treaty of Brest-Litovsk in March 1918, coal started to arrive again from eastern Turkey.

1918 

On 20 January 1918,  and  left the Dardanelles under the command of Vice Admiral Rebeur-Paschwitz, who had replaced Souchon the previous September. Rebeur-Paschwitz's intention was to draw Allied naval forces away from Palestine in support of Turkish forces there. Rebeur-Paschwitz then decided to proceed to the port of Mudros; there the British pre-dreadnought battleship  was raising steam to attack the Turkish ships. While en route,  struck several mines and sank;  hit three mines as well. The British attacked  with bombers from No. 2 Wing of the Royal Naval Air Service while she was grounded and hit her twice, but the bombs from the light aircraft were not heavy enough to do any serious damage. The monitor  attempted to shell  on the evening of 24 January, but only managed to fire ten rounds before withdrawing to escape the Turkish artillery fire.

Before the repair work was carried out,  escorted the members of the Ottoman Armistice Commission to Odessa on 30 March 1918, after the Treaty of Brest-Litovsk was signed. After returning to Constantinople she sailed in May to Sevastopol where she had her hull cleaned and some leaks repaired.  and several destroyers sailed for Novorossiysk on 28 June to intern the remaining Soviet warships, but they had already been scuttled when the Turkish ships arrived. The destroyers remained, but  returned to Sevastopol. On 14 July the ship was laid up for the rest of the war. While in Sevastopol, dockyard workers scraped fouling from the ship's bottom.  subsequently returned to Constantinople, where from 7 August to 19 October a concrete cofferdam was installed to repair one of the three areas damaged by mines.

The German navy formally transferred ownership of the vessel to the Turkish government on 2 November. According to the terms of the Treaty of Sèvres between the Ottoman Empire and the Western Allies,  was to have been handed over to the Royal Navy as war reparations, but this was not done due to the Turkish War of Independence, which broke out immediately after World War I ended, as Greece attempted to seize territory from the crumbling Ottoman Empire. After modern Turkey emerged from the war victorious, the Treaty of Sèvres was discarded and the Treaty of Lausanne was signed in its place in 1923. Under this treaty, the new Turkish republic retained possession of much of its fleet, including .

Post-war service 
During the 1920s, a commitment to refurbish  as the centerpiece of the new country's fleet was the only constant element of the various naval policies which were put forward.  The battlecruiser remained in İzmit until 1926, in a neglected state: only two of her boilers worked, she could not steer or steam, and she still had two unrepaired scars from the mine damage in 1918. Enough money was raised to allow the purchase of a new  floating dock from Germany, as  could not be towed anywhere without risk of her sinking in rough seas. The French company Atelier et Chantiers de St. Nazaire-Penhöet was contracted in December 1926 to oversee the subsequent refit, which was carried out by the Gölcük Naval Shipyard. Work proceeded over three years (1927–1930); it was delayed when several compartments of the dock collapsed while being pumped out.  was slightly damaged before she could be refloated and the dock had to be repaired before the repair work could begin. The Minister of Marine, Ihsan Bey (İhsan Eryavuz), was convicted of embezzlement in the resulting investigation. Other delays were caused by fraud charges which resulted in the abolition of the Ministry of Marine. The Turkish Military's Chief of Staff, Marshal Fevzi, opposed naval construction and slowed down all naval building programs following the fraud charges. Intensive work on the battlecruiser only began after the Greek Navy conducted a large-scale naval exercise off Turkey in September 1928 and the Turkish Government perceived a need to counter Greece's naval superiority. The Turks also ordered four destroyers and two submarines from Italian shipyards. The Greek Government proposed a 10-year "holiday" from naval building modeled on the Washington Treaty when it learned that  was to be brought back into service, though it reserved the right to build two new cruisers. The Turkish Government rejected this proposal, and claimed that the ship was intended to counter the growing strength of the Soviet Navy in the Black Sea.

Two of the 15 cm guns were removed from their casemate positions. Her armor protection was not upgraded to take the lessons of the Battle of Jutland into account, and she had only  of armor above her magazines.  was recommissioned in 1930, resuming her role as flagship of the Turkish Navy, and performed better than expected in her speed trials; her subsequent gunnery and fire control trials were also successful. The four destroyers, which were needed to protect the battlecruiser, entered service between 1931 and 1932; their performance never met the design specifications. In response to s return to service, the Soviet Union transferred the battleship  and light cruiser  from the Baltic in late 1929 to ensure that the Black Sea Fleet retained parity with the Turkish Navy. The Greek Government also responded by ordering two destroyers.

Another short refit was conducted in 1938, and in November that year she carried the remains of Mustafa Kemal Atatürk from Istanbul to İzmit. She and the other ships of the navy were considered outdated by the British Naval Attache by 1937, partly due to their substandard anti-aircraft armament, but in 1938 the Turkish government began planning to expand the force. Under these plans the surface fleet was to comprise two 10,000-ton cruisers and twelve destroyers.  would be retained until the second cruiser was commissioned in 1945, and the navy expected to build a 23,000-ton ship between 1950 and 1960. The naval building program did not come about, as the foreign shipyards which were to build the ships concentrated on the needs of their own nations leading up to World War II.

 remained in service throughout World War II. In 1941, her anti-aircraft battery was strengthened to four  guns, ten  guns, and four  guns. These were later increased to twenty-two 40 mm guns and twenty-four 20 mm guns. On 5 April 1946, the American battleship , light cruiser , and destroyer  arrived in Istanbul to return the remains of Turkish ambassador Münir Ertegün.  greeted the ships in the Bosphorus, where she and Missouri exchanged 19-gun salutes.

After 1948, the ship was stationed in either İzmit or Gölcük. She was decommissioned from active service on 20 December 1950 and stricken from the Navy register on 14 November 1954. When Turkey joined NATO in 1952, the ship was assigned the hull number B70. The Turkish government offered to sell the ship to the West German government in 1963 as a museum ship, but the offer was declined. Turkey sold the ship to M.K.E. Seyman in 1971 for scrapping. She was towed to the breakers on 7 June 1973, and the work was completed in February 1976. By the time of her disposal she was the last dreadnought in existence outside the United States. She was the last surviving ship built by the Imperial German Navy, and the longest-serving dreadnought-type ship in any navy.

Notes

Footnotes

Citations

References

Further reading
 
 

1911 ships
Moltke-class battlecruisers
Ships built in Hamburg
World War I battlecruisers of Germany
World War I cruisers of the Ottoman Empire
Maritime incidents in 1918